Lorelei Lee (born March 2, 1981) is an American pornographic actor and writer. They identify as non-binary.

Biography
Lorelei Lee debuted in the sex industry at the age of 19, deriving their stage name from Marilyn Monroe's character in Gentlemen Prefer Blondes.

They graduated from San Francisco State University in 2008, and later pursued a master's degree in creative writing at New York University. They have been awarded a National Foundation for Advancement in the Arts "youngARTS Scholarship". They are best known for their performances as a fetish and bondage model, particularly on the pornographic site Kink.com, where they have also worked as a director.

In 2006, they wrote the centerfold text for the Sara Thrustra's Ten Pictures and Two Pin-Ups calendar. Along with fellow Kink model and director Princess Donna, Lee was the subject of Brian Lilla's 2007 independent film Tale of Two Bondage Models, which appeared at the 2008 Tribeca Film Festival. In 2008, they appeared in the documentary 9to5 – Days in Porn and also toured nationally as part of the "Sex Workers' Art Show" with other prominent members of the kink and sex-positivity community. In 2009, Lee appeared in Graphic Sexual Horror, a documentary about Insex, a now-defunct bondage website.

Later that year, they were the subject and lead actress of the short movie Lorelei Lee, which was directed by Simon Grudzen and Jesse Kerman and shown at the Big Sky Documentary Film Festival; the film received multiple awards at the Hot Docs Canadian International Documentary Festival, including Best Directing, Best Original Score and Best Use of Social Issue/Political Genre. In 2010, Lee published an essay, "I'm Leaving You" in Off the Set: Porn Stars and Their Partners, a book of documentary photography by Paul Sarkis that explores the off-screen romantic relationships of ten couples who perform in porn, and which features photos of Lorelei with their partner at the time.

In May 2011, Variety announced the production of About Cherry, an independent movie written by Lee alongside Stephen Elliott, directed by the same Elliott and starring James Franco, Heather Graham and Lili Taylor. The film premiered at the 2012 Berlin International Film Festival.

Hustler Magazine ranked Lee at eight on their 2011 list of the Top 10 Smartest Porn Stars.

In 2012 Lee, along with adult performers Isis Love and Princess Donna, was the subject of a documentary film about the website Kink.com, Public Sex, Private Lives, which was, in part, funded by donations made to Kickstarter.

As of 2016, Lee teaches writing at New York University and at the San Francisco Center for Sex and Culture.

Lee identifies as non-binary and queer and has been married to a trans man since 2012.

In 2020, Lee graduated magna cum laude with their JD from Cornell Law School and was inducted into the Order of the Coif. They became a Justice Catalyst Fellow at the Cornell Law School Gender Justice Clinic in 2021.

Involvement in Milk Nymphos trial
Lee starred in John Stagliano's enema-focused film Milk Nymphos, which in 2008 became the subject of a federal obscenity trial. The case reached federal court in Washington, D.C., and, on July 16, 2010, Lee was expected to testify as a witness on behalf of the defense. Citing concerns of personal safety, Lee requested to testify under their stage name; the prosecution objected, arguing that allowing them to do so "gives some air of legitimacy to the porn star" (which Lee later called "incredibly insulting") and that "they shouldn't be treated any differently than anyone else in this case". The case was ultimately dismissed on July 16, 2010, before Lee was scheduled to testify.

Writing
1. “Cash/Consent, The War on Sex Work” (2019), an extensive essay reflecting their personal experience in the pornography industry

Awards and nominations

References

External links

 
 
 
 

1981 births
21st-century American writers
Alt porn
American adult models
American pornographic film actresses
American pornographic film directors
Screenwriters from California
Bondage models
Pornographic film directors
LGBT people from New York (state)
Living people
Actresses from San Francisco
Pornographic film actors from California
Queer pornographic film actors
San Francisco State University alumni
Writers from New York (state)
Writers from San Francisco
Sex positivism
Film directors from San Francisco
21st-century American screenwriters
American non-binary actors
New York University alumni
Cornell Law School alumni
American non-binary writers